The 2012–13 season was the 111th season of football for Norwich City. It was Norwich City's second campaign in the Premier League since being promoted in the 2010–11 season. It was their 23rd season in the top flight of English football. During the season, they competed in the League Cup and the FA Cup exiting at the quarter final and fourth rounds respectively.  During their FA Cup campaign Norwich became the first top flight club to lose to a non-league club since 1989 when they lost 1–0 at home to Luton Town in the fourth round. Sébastien Bassong was named player of the season.

Club staff

Backroom staff

Board of directors

Players

Squad

Nationality: when 2 flags, 1st flag = country that plays for internationally, 2nd flag = country of birth
Apps/goals: statistics prior to 2012/13 season

Transfers

In

Out

Loan

Active loan deals in bold

Statistics
Last updated on 20 May 2013

Appearances, goals and cards

Status (Premier League eligibility):
HG = Home grown player named in 25 man squad
PL = Non home grown player named in 25 man squad
U21 = Under 21 players

Source: Premier League Squad list: Sept 2012, Feb 2013

Goalscorers

Captains

Penalties

Pre-season
Note: this section relates to first team friendlies only.

Competitions

Overall

Competition record
{| class="wikitable" style="text-align: center"
|-
! rowspan="2" width="100" | Competition
! rowspan="2" width="90" | Started round
! rowspan="2" width="90" | Current position/round
! rowspan="2" width="90" | Final position/round
! rowspan="2" width="110" | First match
! rowspan="2" width="110" | Last match
! colspan="8" | Record
|-
! width="25" | P
! width="25" | W
! width="25" | D
! width="25" | L
! width="25" | GF
! width="25" | GA
! width="25" | GD
! width="40" | Win %
|-

|-

|-

|-
! colspan="6" style="text-align: right;"| Total

|-

Summary

Premier League

League table

Results summary

Results by round

Norwich City's second season in the premier league started with a heavy defeat away to Fulham.  Damien Duff, Alexander Kačaniklić both scored one, Mladen Petrić scored two and Steve Sidwell scored a penalty.  Manager Chris Hughton said that Norwich simply didn't defend enough.  Chris Hughton responded by signing defender Sébastien Bassong and defensive midfielder Alexander Tettey before the following game at home to QPR.  Bassong and summer loan signing Javier Garrido made their débuts for the club in the match.  Simeon Jackson opened the scoring and with Bobby Zamora scoring an equaliser.  Djibril Cissé missed a penalty which was awarded following a coming together between Cissé and Bassong.  The month ended with Norwich signing goalkeeper Mark Bunn from Blackburn Rovers.

FA Cup

League Cup

Notes

References

Norwich City F.C. seasons
Norwich City